Botryosporium pulchrum is an ascomycete fungus that is a plant pathogen. It was described by August Carl Joseph Corda in 1840. It causes leaf mold in geraniums.

See also 
 List of geranium diseases

References 

Fungal plant pathogens and diseases
Eudicot diseases
Ornamental plant pathogens and diseases
Ascomycota enigmatic taxa
Fungi described in 1840
Taxa named by August Carl Joseph Corda